is a near-Earth asteroid that was discovered on 10 January 2010 at Grove Creek Observatory, Australia.

Italian scientists Ernesto Guido and Giovanni Sostero told RIA Novosti that it had an orbital period of almost exactly one year and might be a spent rocket booster.  However, it was determined that it is a near-Earth asteroid.

The Nagasaki "Fat Man" atom bomb had a yield between 13–18 kT.

It has an uncertainty parameter of 2 and has been observed by radar. Radar observations show the asteroid is elongated and is about 30 meters in diameter. It may be a contact binary.

See also 
 
 List of asteroid close approaches to Earth

References

External links 
 MPEC 2010-A59 : 2010 AL30 – (Minor Planet Center / 2010 Jan. 11)
 MPEC 2010-A64 : 2010 AL30 – (Minor Planet Center / 2010 Jan. 12)
 Mystery object 2010 AL30 to pass within 130,000 km of Earth (heraldsun.com)
 NEO 2010 AL30 Close Approach – (Remanzacco Observatory / January 11, 2010)
 Goldstone detects "STRONG" radar echoes from 2010 AL30  – (Emily Lakdawalla / Jan. 12, 2010)
 First Results of the Goldstone High-Resolution Chirp Radar Imaging System: Application to Near-Earth Asteroid 2010 AL30 – (2011 October 4)
 Weird Object Zooming by Earth Wednesday is Likely an Asteroid, www.space.com, January 2010
 
 
 

Minor planet object articles (unnumbered)

20100113
20100110